Holul (also Romanized as Holūl and Halūl; also known as Khalīlī and Khalūl) is a village in Nur Ali Beyk Rural District, in the Central District of Saveh County, Markazi Province, Iran. At the 2006 census, its population was 356, in 75 families.

References 

Populated places in Saveh County